Kim Hyeseon (born September 28, 1969) is a South Korean actress. She is best known for her leading role in the television drama First Wives' Club (2007–2008).

Career
Kim Hyeseon began modeling when she was in middle school. While attending Anyang High School of the Arts, Kim appeared in commercials for Orion, Lotte Samkang and Korea Cosmetics, and subsequently made her acting debut in 1986. She quickly gained popularity as a teen star with an innocent and bright image. Kim also became active in Japanese entertainment in 1988, where she was known under the name  and released two photo books titled Temptation of the White Wind and Like It!. In 1993, she won Best Supporting Actress at the Blue Dragon Film Awards for her performance in Love Is Oh Yeah!.

After getting married in 1995, Kim retired from show business and immigrated to the United States. But she returned to acting two years later in the television drama The River of Maternal Love (1997). As she grew older, she began playing ajummas (middle-aged wives and mothers), notably in Famous Princesses (2006), First Wives' Club (2007) and What's for Dinner? (2009). Then in 2011, Kim was cast in her first big-screen leading role in 17 years. In My Secret Partner, she played a famous chef in her 40s who becomes involved in a passionate romance with a younger man in his 20s, and the film became controversial due to its explicit content, which featured Kim in a number of nude scenes.

Personal life
Kim married her first husband in 1995, but after eight years of marriage, they divorced in September 2003. She remarried in July 2004, but she and her second husband, a businessman, divorced in 2009. Kim has two children, a son and a daughter.

Filmography

Film

Television series

Awards and nominations

References

External links
 Kim Hyeseon Fan Café at Daum 
 
 
 
 

1969 births
Living people
South Korean television actresses
South Korean film actresses
Dankook University alumni